Steven Sim Chee Keong (born 13 May 1982) is a Malaysian politician who has served as the Deputy Minister of Finance II in the Pakatan Harapan (PH) administration under Prime Minister Anwar Ibrahim since December 2022 as well as the Member of Parliament (MP) for Bukit Mertajam since May 2013. He served as the Deputy Minister of Youth and Sports in the Pakatan Harapan (PH) administration under former Prime Minister Mahathir Mohamad and former Minister Syed Saddiq from July 2018 to the collapse of the PH administration in February 2020. 

He is a member of the Democratic Action Party (DAP), a component party of the PH opposition coalition. He currently serves as the National Organising Secretary of DAP since March 2022, after being elected into the DAP central executive committee (CEC). 

In January 2011, he was appointed as a member of the Seberang Perai Municipal Council (MPSP), one of the largest local governments of Malaysia.

He writes regularly for Penang Monthly (formerly Penang Economic Monthly) as well as contributing opinion pieces to prominent Malaysian online news portals such as Malaysiakini and the Malaysian Insider. He has authored 4 books, including a contemporary socio-political critique of the Malay classic Hikayat Hang Tuah, Hang Tuah: Adiwira Bangsa in 2021.

In 2012, he was named as a Young Global Leader of the Geneva-based World Economic Forum. He is also a member of the Board of Directors of Penang Institute, a public policy think-tank based in Penang.

He speaks fluently in English, Malay, Hokkien, and Mandarin.

Education and Pre-Political Career
Sim's early education started at SK Stowell and Bukit Mertajam High School (HSBM). He graduated from University of Malaya in Computer Science in 2004. He later pursued a Masters in Sustainable Development at the Jeffrey Sachs Centre on Sustainable Development in Sunway University and graduated in 2020. 

He served in a multinational corporation for three years before joining the Penang state government in 2008. He also sits on the governing board of the Penang Institute, a leading public policy think tank based in Penang, Malaysia.

Sim was formerly the executive secretary of the Network of Social Democracy in Asia, a regional dialogue of political parties, scholars and NGOs of the social democratic persuasion.

Bibliography
Sim is also the author of four books. 

The Audacity to Think: An Invitation to Rethink Politics (2012); Being Malaysia (2018); an anthology of Malay poems, Dalam Salju Ada Bunga (2018); and a contemporary socio-political critique of the Malay classic Hikayat Hang Tuah, Hang Tuah: Adiwira Bangsa (2021).

Election Results

References

External links
 StevenSim.com
 The Audacity to Think

Living people
1982 births
People from Penang
Malaysian politicians of Chinese descent
Democratic Action Party (Malaysia) politicians
Members of the Dewan Rakyat
21st-century Malaysian politicians
University of Malaya alumni